Somatic damage may refer to any of the health effects of radiation other than teratogenesis, including
Acute radiation syndrome
Radiation burns
Radiation-induced cancer
Radiation-induced heart disease
Radiation-induced lung injury
Radiation-induced thyroiditis
Radiation induced cognitive decline